Union sportive Oyonnax Rugby is a French rugby union club from Oyonnax  in the Ain département of the région Auvergne-Rhône-Alpes, currently playing in Rugby Pro D2, the second division of the country's professional rugby system. They play at Stade Charles-Mathon (capacity 11,400). They wear black and red.

History
They were founded in 1909 as Club Sportif Oyonnaxien and were renamed Union Sportive Oyonaxienne in 1940, as sports clubs were forced to unite by the Vichy régime. Oyonnax played in the regional leagues until 1967 when they joined the First Division (64 clubs). They were relegated to the lower divisions a few years later and bounced back to Group B of the First Division (the Second Division in fact) in 1988. Finally, in 2003 they reached the Fédérale 1 final and although they went down to Limoges (18-20), they moved on to the professional Pro D2.  In the 2012/13 season, they won Pro D2 and were promoted to the top-flight Top 14. They were repromoted after 2016/17, having been relegated the previous season.

Honours
 1923/24 Winners Première Série
 1966/67 Runner-up Second Division
 1991/92 Runner-up Fédérale 1 Division B
 2000/01 Winners Fédérale 1
 2002/03 Runner-up Fédérale 1, promoted to Pro D2
 2012/13 Winners Rugby Pro D2, promoted to Top 14
 2016/17 Winners Rugby Pro D2, promoted to Top 14

Current standings

Current squad

The Oyonnax squad for the 2021–22 season is:

Notes:

See also
 List of rugby union clubs in France
 Rugby union in France

References

External links
  Oyonnax Rugby Official website

Oyonnax
Rugby clubs established in 1909
Sport in Ain